Richard Ronald Gyselman (April 6, 1908 – September 20, 1990) was a third baseman in Major League Baseball. He played for the Boston Braves in 1933 and 1934.

For his success in minor league baseball, Gyselman was a 2003 inductee in the Pacific Coast League Hall of Fame.

External links

1908 births
1990 deaths
Major League Baseball third basemen
Boston Braves players
Baseball players from California